Most likely refers to either of two micronations:

La  République de Montmartre (distinct from the  Free Commune of Montmartre) in Paris, France (in French).(English translation of République de Montmartre); (English translation of Commune libre de Montmartre)

The Most Serene Federal Republic of Montmartre, mostly in New York City's Manhattan.

Micronations
Montmartre